Padiyam  is a village in Thrissur district in the state of Kerala,The heaven on earth to be more specific.A place where people enjoy their life in  
India.

Demographics
 India census, Padiyam had a population of 11063 with 5111 males and 5952 females.

References

Villages in Thrissur district